The 2015–16 South Carolina State Bulldogs basketball team represented South Carolina State University during the 2015–16 NCAA Division I men's basketball season. The Bulldogs, led by third year head coach Murray Garvin, played their home games at the SHM Memorial Center and were members of the Mid-Eastern Athletic Conference. They finished the season 19–15, 12–4 in MEAC play to finish in a tie for second place. They defeated Coppin State and Norfolk State to advance to the championship game of the MEAC tournament where they lost to Hampton. They were invited to the CollegeInsider.com Tournament where they lost in the first round to Grand Canyon.

Roster

Schedule

|-
!colspan=9 style="background:#; color:white;"| Regular season

|-
!colspan=9 style="background:#; color:white;"|MEAC tournament

|-
!colspan=9 style="background:#; color:white;"| CIT

References

South Carolina State Bulldogs basketball seasons
South Carolina State
South Carolina State